Highway 11A is a short freeway in the Canadian province of Saskatchewan serving the city of Regina. It is the original configuration for Highway 11 as it approached Regina and was designated after the Regina Bypass was opened in 2019.

Highway 11 used to be signed through Regina along Albert Street and Ring Road to Victoria Avenue where it terminated at the Highway 1; however, the Highway 11A designation only pertains to the area outside city limits where it is under provincial jurisdiction.

Exit list
From south to north.

References

External links

011A
011A
Roads in Regina, Saskatchewan